Clavatula bimarginata, common name the two-edged turrid, is a species of sea snail, a marine gastropod mollusk in the family Clavatulidae.

Description
The size of an adult shell varies between 18 mm and 60 mm.

Distribution
This marine species occurs in the Atlantic Ocean from Mauritania to South Africa.

References

 Lamarck, Animaux sans vertèbres., VII, p. 91. 
 Wolff, W.J.; Duiven, P.; Esselink, P.; Gueve, A. (1993). Biomass of macrobenthic tidal flat fauna of the Banc d'Arguin, Mauritania. Hydrobiologia 258(1-3): 151-163

External links
 

bimarginata
Gastropods described in 1822